Forma 1, or simply Forma, was a group or school of young Italian artists formed in the years immediately after the end of the  Second World War. It was formed in 1947, and was re-founded in 1961 as the group Continuità.

References

Further reading 

 B. Krimmel, Carlo Bertelli (1987).

 Simonetta Lux Statera (2003). Roma: Gangemi. .

Italian art movements
1947 establishments in Italy
Italian artist groups and collectives